Kortrijk (or Kortrik;), sometimes known in English as Courtrai or Courtray, is a Belgian city and municipality in the Flemish province of West Flanders.

With its 79,000 inhabitants (2023) Kortrijk is the capital and largest city of the judicial and administrative arrondissement of Kortrijk. The wider municipality comprises the city of Courtrai proper and the villages of Aalbeke, Bellegem, Bissegem, Heule, Kooigem, Marke, and Rollegem. Courtrai is also part of the cross-border Lille-Kortrijk-Tournai metropolitan area.

Mouscron in Wallonia is just south of Courtrai.

Courtrai originated from a Gallo-Roman town, Cortoriacum, at a crossroads near the Leie river and two Roman roads. In the Middle Ages, Courtrai grew significantly thanks to the flax and wool industry with France and England and became one of the biggest and richest cities in Flanders. The city is often referred to as City of Groeninge or City of the Golden Spurs, referring to the Battle of Courtrai or the Battle of the Golden Spurs which took place on 11 July 1302 on the Fields of Groeninge in Courtrai. In 1820 the Treaty of Kortrijk was signed, laying out the still-current borders between France and Belgium. Throughout the 19th and 20th century, the flax industry flourished and remains important within the Belgian textile industry today.

Courtrai is the largest city in southern West Flanders, with several hospitals, colleges and a university. Courtrai was the first city in Belgium with a pedestrian shopping street, the Korte Steenstraat.

History

Name
The Latin name Cortoriacum means the settlement near the curb in the river. There is also mention of 'Cortoracum' in some literature. Its name later evolved to 'Cortrycke', 'Cortryck' and 'Kortrijk' (19th century). In French and in English, the city is called Courtrai.

Origins Roman times 
Findings from an archeological dig in 1950 in which remains of three Roman funeral pyres were found suggest that the vicus was used as an encampment by the Romans during their invasion of Britain in AD 43.

Cortoriacum was a larger Gallo-Roman vicus of civitas Menapiorum at an important crossroads near the Lys river of the Roman roads linking Tongeren and Cassel and Tournai and Oudenburg. It was first mentioned in a document from the 4th or 5th century called Notitia Dignitatum where the cortoriacenses (cavalry) troops were mentioned. In the 9th century, Baldwin II, Count of Flanders established fortifications against the Vikings.  The town gained its city charter in 1190 from Philip, Count of Flanders.  The population growth required new defensive walls, part of which can still be seen today (the Broeltorens, Armory, Kortrijk). Several local places still refer to physical parts of the defensive structures around Kortrijk (Walle, Waterpoort, Menenpoort, Gentsepoort, Brugsepoort, Kasteelkaai); Most of the physical parts have been overbuilt or destroyed.

In the 13th century, the battles between Fernando of Portugal, Count of Flanders and his first cousin, King Louis VIII of France, led to the destruction of the city.  The Counts of Flanders had it rebuilt soon after. To promote industry and weaving in the town, Joan, Countess of Flanders exempted settlers in Courtrai from property tax. From that time, Kortrijk gained great importance as a center of linen production.

Battle of the Golden Spurs 

In 1302, the population of Bruges started a successful uprising against the French, who had annexed Flanders a couple of years earlier.  On 18 May the French population in that city was massacred, an event that could not go unpunished.  The famous ensuing Battle of Courtrai in 1302, also known as the Battle of the Golden Spurs (Dutch: Guldensporenslag), between the Flemish people, mostly commoners and farmers, and Philip the Fair's knights took place near Courtrai on 11 July, resulting in a victory for Flanders; the date is commemorated as a national holiday by the Flemish community.

Following a new uprising by the Flemish in 1323, this time against their own Count Louis I, the French invaded again.  These Flemish acquisitions were consolidated by the French at the Battle of Cassel (1328).

Louis I's son Louis II lost the city to a Flemish uprising led by Philip van Artevelde in 1381, but the Flemish were later decisively defeated at the 1382 Battle of Roosebeke by Louis II with French support, resulting in a new wave of plundering and destruction.

15th century to modern times 
Most of the 15th century was prosperous under the Dukes of Burgundy, until the death of the Burgundian heiress Mary of Burgundy in 1482, which ushered in renewed fighting with France.

The 16th century was marked by the confrontations engendered by the Reformation and the uprising of the Netherlands against Spain.

Louis XIV's reign saw Courtrai occupied by the French five times in sixty years and its former fortifications razed. The Treaty of Utrecht assigned the area to the Austrian Habsburgs.

After the French Revolution and the Napoleonic era, the textile industry, based on flax, and the general economy of the city prospered again.

Courtrai was heavily bombed in the summer of 1917, but was liberated by the British Army the following year. During World War II the city was an important railway hub for the German army, and for this reason was the target of several Allied airstrikes. On 21 July 1944 (the Belgian National Day) around 300 Avro Lancasters dropped over 5,000 bombs on the city center. Many historical buildings on the central square, as well as the old railway station, were destroyed.

Battle of Courtrai 
Battles fought there in 1302, 1382, 1580, 1793, 1794, 1814, 1815, and 1918 have each been called Battle of Courtrai.

Geography

Municipality 
After the 1977 fusion the city is made up of:
 I Kortrijk
 II Heule
 III Bissegem
 IV Marke
 V Aalbeke
 VI Rollegem
 VII Bellegem
 VIII Kooigem

Neighboring municipalities 
The metropolitan area, including the outer commuter zone, also consists of Kuurne, Wevelgem, Zwevegem and Harelbeke. Although these municipalities have strong morphologic ties with Courtrai, they aren't officially part of the city.

 a. Kuurne (municipality Kuurne)
 b. Harelbeke (municipality Harelbeke)
 c. Zwevegem (municipality Zwevegem)
 d. Sint-Denijs (municipality Zwevegem)
 e. Spiere (municipality Spiere-Helkijn)
 f. Dottenijs (city of Moeskroen)
 g. Luingne (city of Moeskroen)
 h. Moeskroen (city of Moeskroen)
 i. Rekkem (city of Menen)
 j. Lauwe (city of Menen)
 k. Wevelgem (municipality Wevelgem)
 l. Gullegem (municipality Wevelgem)
 m. Sint-Eloois-Winkel (municipality Ledegem)
 n. Lendelede, with Sint-Katharina (municipality Lendelede)

Climate
Kortrijk has an oceanic climate (Köppen Cfb).

Main sights

Architecture 
Much of the city's medieval architecture remains intact and is remarkably well preserved and restored. The city centre is one of the largest car-free areas in Belgium. The béguinage, as well as the belfry, have each been recognized by UNESCO as World Heritage Sites.
Interesting highlights are:

Civil 
 Medieval Kortrijk City Hall on the main square, the Grote Markt. The façade of the late-Gothic, early Renaissance city hall is adorned with the statues of the Counts of Flanders.
 The belfry is surmounted by a statue of Mercury, god of the merchants. The belfry is classified by UNESCO as a World Heritage Site, on the list of Belfries of Belgium and France.
 Near-identical medieval Broel Towers with the bridge in between that spans the river Leie. (the Speyetower and the Ingelburgtower)
 Artillerytower (Artillerietoren)
 Mont de Piété (Berg van Barmhartigheid or house of Mercy)
 Weigh house (Stadswaag) on the St.Michael-square
 Our Lady Hospital (Onze-Lieve-Vrouwehospitaal), founded in 1200–1204.
 Baggaertshof, often called Kortrijk's second Beguinage, contains a Botanical garden
 Groeningekouter contains the Groeningegate and the Groeninge Monument, to commemorate the 600th anniversary of the famous Battle of the Golden Spurs

Religious 
 The Saint-Martin church dates from the 13th century but was mostly rebuilt after a fire in the 15th century.  It now houses a 48-bell carillon. Its 83-meter (272 feet) tower remains the highest building in the city.
 The beguinage is one of the quaintest sites in the city. It too, was listed by UNESCO as a World Heritage Site, on the list of "Flemish Béguinages".
 The church of Our Lady (Onze-Lieve-Vrouwekerk) is former collegiate church. Here the golden spurs taken from the battlefield in 1302 were hung. It houses a rich interior with an altar piece of van Dyck.
 the Count’s chapel (Gravenkapel), built after the example of la Sainte Chapelle in Paris as shrine for Louis II of Flanders.
 Saint-Michaelschurch; a church of the Society of Jesus
 Saint-Johnschurch in the St.-Johnsquarter; a Neo-Gothic basilica
 Groeninge Abbey
 Saint Eligiuschurch
 Saint-Pius X-church
 Saint-Rochchurch
 Saint-Elisabethchurch
 Saint-Anthonychurch or Toontjes kerk with the pilgrimage of Isidore of Saint Joseph
 Saint-Annechurch
 Saint-Theresiachurch
 Father Damienchurch

Museums 
Museums in Courtrai include:
 Kortrijk 1302: seven centuries in one day, a historic museum about the famous Battle of the Golden Spurs, which gave Flanders its official holiday (11 July)
 Broelmuseum (Museum of Fine Arts and archaeological museum), with paintings by Roelant Savery and international Ceramic.
 National Flax Museum in honour of the plant that once was the main driver of Kortrijk’s economy. This museum will be relocated.
 Groeninge Abbey with the Groeningemuseum. This museum gives you an overview of Kortrijk's history.
 Beguinage museum located in the old town, in the béguinage.
 Flemish Film museum and archive
 Bakery- and Millmuseum, located in an old windmill.
 Museum of Agriculture
 International Rose gardens, located in the park of the Castle t Hooghe, in the Hoog-Kortrijk quarter just in front of Kortrijk Xpo.
 Begijnhofmuseum

Transport

Road 
Courtrai lies at the intersection of three highways:
 The E17: connects Courtrai with Ghent, Sint-Niklaas and Antwerp to the northeast, and with Lille and Paris to the south-west.
 The E403: connects Courtrai with Bruges and Ostend to the north, and with Tournai, Mons and Charleroi to the south-east.
 The Belgian highway A19: connects Courtrai with Ypres and the Belgian coast.
 In addition Courtrai also has two ringways:
 The R8: connects the outskirts of Kortrijk with each other and the surrounding villages, and also leads to the A19, E403 and E17 roads.
 The R36: connects the different downtown quarters with each other, and provides access to the main avenues.

Railway 
 The municipality of Courtrai has two railway stations:
 Kortrijk main railway station: an international railway station with direct connections to Brugge Centraal (Bruges), Brussel Zuid, Antwerp, Ghent, Poperinge and Ieper (Ypres), Oudenaarde, other Belgian towns and Lille in France.  The station also offers a direct connection to Brussels Airport.
 Bissegem Station: a regional railway station in the village of Bissegem with connections to Ypres.

Public city transport 
Kortrijk has an extensive web of public transport lines, operated by De Lijn, providing access to the city centre and the suburbs (city lines) and to many towns and villages in the region around the city (regional lines).
 City buses:
 Line 1: Station – Kortrijk Xpo – Kinepolis – Leiedal
 Line 2: Station – Lange Munte
 Line 4: Station – Bissegem Station – Heule Kransvijver
 Line 50: Station – Kuurne Seizoenswijk
 Line 51: Station – Kuurne Sint-Pieter
 Line 6: Station – Shopping Center (– Industriezone) – Heule Markt
 Line 9: Station – Cederlaan
 Line 12: Station – Kinepolis – Bellegem – Rollegem (– Aalbeke)
 Line 13: Station – Hoog Kortrijk
 Line 80/81: Station – Marke
 Line 91/92/93: Station – Zwevegem
 Regional buses
At Kortrijk main railway station, there is a bus station where regional buses stop as well.

Airport 

 The city has an airport known as Kortrijk-Wevelgem International Airport, which is mainly used for business travel and medical flights. Kortrijk Airport is located northwest of the city centre, next to the R8 ringroad.
 The national Brussels Airport, one hour away by train or car, offers the best international connectivity.
 The Lille Lesquin International Airport is located 35 kilometres from Kortrijk.

Waterways 

The river Lys (Leie) is an important way of transporting goods through inland navigation. The Bossuit-Kortrijk Canal enables in the city centre a direct connection with the river Scheldt.

Within the City, the river briefly splits in two, to re-join about a mile further. 
 Oude Leie (Old Lys) original southernmost riverbed where the Broel towers still stand.
 Nieuwe Leie (New Lys) New bed that was dug around 1585 by Humans to accommodate water powered equipment.

From the 1970s on, the planning and later the execution of the so-called Leiewerken (Leieworks) started. These construction works comprised the deepening and widening of the river. This would enable ships with 4400 tons to navigate from France to the Scheldt. At the same time, this project included a thorough urban renewal of the riversides in the city. Seven new bridges were to give a new architectural impulse to the river quarters as well as the construction of several new parks along the river.

The following bridges were built during the period of 1997 and 2012:
 Dambrug
 Groeningebrug near the AlbertPark
 Ronde van Vlaanderenbrug near the new Nelson Mandelapark 
 Collegebrug referring to the St Amands college
 Noordbrug (2010)
 Budabrug 
 Reepbrug (to be constructed)

More recently (2018), the banks in front of the Broel Towers were lowered to allow the public to enjoy the historic river banks along both sides of the River Lys (Leie). This area is now known as the Leieboorden (or Banks of the River Lys), a place for pedestrians with bars and restaurants.

Other Smaller Waterways with Historic and Geological value 
Several small streams or Beken in and around Courtrai were of significant topological, historical and Geological value.
Lange Mere Mentioned in the Town accounts of 1412-13 as Langhe Meere. 
Mosscher (High Mossher and Low Mosscher) ending in the Southern Moat (Sanderus Map mentions only the 'Mosscher as a single toponym. It was also mentioned in almost full length on the Deventer Map.Groeninghe (first mentioned as Groeninc in 1412 ) Its name came from the green color of the flooded meadow where it originated. Grote Vijver (first mention as Hoghen vivere in the town accounts of 1416-17). St-Jans stream - Human Dug connecting stream Klakkaert stream
 Moat around the City (south of the Leie or Lys)NeveldriesBloedmeers Cycling and pedestrian areas 
Cars are required to yield to pedestrians and cyclists. In general, cars are led to large underground car parks in the historic centre of Courtrai or Park&Ride parking outside the town centre. Large parts of the historic centre are car free.

 Economy 
The city is historically connected with the flax and the textile industry, and still today the textile industry remains important in the region.
Major companies which have headquarters in Courtrai include Cisco, Barco and Bekaert.

 Education 
Courtrai serves as an educational centre in south West Flanders, attracting students from the entire region.

There are 55 schools in Courtrai, on 72 different locations throughout the city, with an estimated 21,000 students.

The city also provides higher education. The KULAK, a campus of the Catholic University of Leuven, is located in on the south edge of the city, in the Hoog Kortrijk quarter. Other institutes of higher education include the Katholieke Hogeschool Zuid-West-Vlaanderen (KATHO) and Hogeschool West-Vlaanderen (HOWEST) university colleges. There is also a campus of Ghent University.

 European cooperation 
This has created an urban area that extends across linguistic and national borders. The mayors of Lille, Courtrai and Tournai met in Courtrai on 28 January 2008 to sign a document creating the first European Grouping of Territorial Cooperation within the EU. The purpose of this organisation is to facilitate the movement of people within this area of nearly 2 million people.
 Courtrai is a member of the Eurotowns network.

 Culture 

 Newspaper 

 Courtrai used to have its own newspaper in times of war, called het Kortrijks Oorlogsblad.

 Music 

 Courtrai has widely recognised local artists, such as:
 Fapy Lafertin, foremost exponent of the Belgian-Dutch style of gypsy jazz.
 Goose, electronic rock band with international projection.
 Amenra, extreme metal band prominent in the European metal scene.
 Marcel Ponseele, baroque oboist known for his Bach performances and recordings.
 Balthazar, indie rock band popular in both Belgium and the Netherlands.
 Michaela Karadjian, soprano Opera singer.

 Theatres and concert venues 

 Courtrai has several cultural centres, each comprising different locations:
 Cultural Centre Kortrijk
 City Theatre (De Schouwburg, see picture), a neo-Renaissance architecture theatre known for its glass ceiling, an artwork of the French-Algerian artist Alberola
 Arenatheatre
 Antigone Theatre
 Buda Kunstencentrum (Buda Arts Centre), comprising the cinema Budascoop, the artist residence Tacktower and the artist creation space Budafactory
 The Concertstudio
 Music Centre Track*
 Concert venue De Kreun Cinemas
 Kinepolis, a modern cinema multiplex with 10 screens.
 Budascoop, a 5 screen cinema, specialised in European movies.

 Festivals and events 
The city is host to some sizable cultural events such as:
 Day of the Flemish Community (11 July)
 Golden River City Jazz Festival (first weekend of September)
 Humorologie: cabaret festival
 Next: arts festival in the Eurodistrict Kortrijk-Lille-Tournai
 Happy New Ears: festival of experimental modern music
 Budafest: theatre festival
 The Internationaal Festival van Vlaanderen (April–May): several concerts of classical and modern music.
 Novarock: rock festival in Kortrijk Xpo
 Easter Carnival (Paasfoor): during the weeks after Easter
 Sinxenfestival: one of the most vivid festivals downtown with street artists, concerts and flea markets all over town
 Kortrijk Congé (July)
 Alcatraz Hard Rock & Metal Festival (August)
 Summer Carnival (weekend in August)
 Student Welcome Concert: rock festival to celebrate the start of the new academic year at the Kortrijk University and the Kortrijk Colleges.

Also, trade shows and events such as the international Design Fair Interieur, Busworld and the Eurodogshow take place in the Kortrijk Xpo event center. These fairs attract numerous visitors to the city.

In July and August there are various boat tours on the river Leie.

 Food 
Local specialities include Kalletaart (apple cake with Calvados), Peperbollen, biscuits, and chocolate little beguines. The town of Heule is the home of the Picobrouwerij Alvinne brewery, while Bellegem is the home of the Bockor brewery.

 Leisure 

 Shopping 

 Kortrijk was the first town in Belgium to have a fully traffic-free shopping street, the Korte Steenstraat (1962). Later, a lot of neighbouring streets were also made traffic-free. As a result, Courtrai nowadays has one of the biggest traffic-free areas in Belgium (comprising Lange Steenstraat, Steenpoort, Sint-Jansttraat, Wijngaardstraat and several squares).
 Courtrai has several indoor shopping malls including the Ring Shopping Kortrijk Noord, Bouwcentrum Pottelberg and K in Kortrijk (opened March 2010). The latter is in the town centre and which links the main shopping street (Lange Steenstraat) with the Veemarket square. It contains up to 90 stores, including Mediamarkt, H&M, Zara and many other clothes, food and houseware stores.

 Parks 

 Beguinagepark
 Groeningepark, on the site of the Groeningekouter where the Battle of Courtrai or the Battle of the Golden Spurs took place. In contains the Groeningegate and the Groeninge Monument
 King Albertpark, with the Leiemonument which commemorates the Battle of the Lys
 Gebroeders van Raemdonckpark
 Queen Astridpark in the Overleie district
 't Plein, a nineteenth-century park, laid out on a former military site
 Park de Blauwe Poort
 Magdalenapark
 Rozentuin, the International Rose Garden
 Stadsgroen Messeyne
 Kasteelpark Blommeghem
 Kasteelpark 't Hooghe
 Nolfpark
 Stadsgroen Venning, with a butterfly garden

 Sports 
 Football 
Kortrijk has three official football clubs.
 K.V. Kortrijk plays in the Belgian First Division A after winning the championship in the former Belgian Second Division during the 2007–2008 season.
 SV Kortrijk plays in the fourth provincial division.
 Wikings Kortrijk is for youth teams.

 Basketball 
 Kortrijk Sport CB
 Basketbalteam Kortrijk

 Cycling 
In Flanders generally, professional cycling is very popular. Many cycling races start, finish or pass through the Kortrijk area. Amongst them are the Driedaagse van West-Vlaanderen, Kuurne–Brussels–Kuurne, Gent–Wevelgem, the Tour of Flanders and Dwars door Vlaanderen. Kortrijk also hosts an after-tour criterium at the start of August called Kortrijk Koerse''. Many of the riders who participated in the Tour de France usually appear at the start. In cyclo-cross, the centre of Kortrijk hosts the Urban Cross, currently part of the X²O Badkamers Trophy.

Rugby 
 Rugbyclub Curtrycke

Tennis 
 Tennis Club De Egelantier

Swimming 
 KZK, Kortrijkse Zwemkring, arguably the best waterpolo team in Belgium, having won the Belgian championship nine times. In the 2007–2008 season they won both the championship and the Belgian cup.

Notable citizens

Town twinning 

Courtrai participates in town twinning to encourage good international relations.
  Bad Godesberg, Germany, since 1964
  Cebu City, Philippines, since 2005
  Frascati, Italy, since 1967
  Greenville, South Carolina, United States, since 1991
  Saint-Cloud, France, since 1993
  Lahore, Pakistan, since 1993
  Tashkent, Uzbekistan, since the late 1980s
  Maidenhead, United Kingdom, since 1981
  Wuxi, China, since 2007

Photo gallery

Notes

References

External links 

  – Information available in Dutch, French, English and German
 Kortrijk airport
 Kortrijk photo gallery

 
Sub-municipalities of Kortrijk
Municipalities of West Flanders